In computer storage, a tape library, sometimes called a tape silo, tape robot or tape jukebox, is a storage device that contains one or more tape drives, a number of slots to hold tape cartridges, a barcode reader to identify tape cartridges and an automated method for loading tapes (a robot). Additionally, the area where tapes that are NOT currently in a silo are stored is also called a tape library. Tape libraries can contain millions of tapes. 

One of the earliest examples was the IBM 3850 Mass Storage System (MSS), announced in 1974.

Design 

These devices can store immense amounts of data, ranging from 20 terabytes up to 2.1 exabytes of data as of 2016.  Such capacity is multiple thousand times that of a typical hard drive and well in excess of what is capable with network attached storage. Typical entry-level solutions cost around $10,000 USD, while high-end solutions can start at as much as $200,000 USD and cost well in excess of $1 million for a fully expanded and configured library.

For large data-storage, they are a cost-effective solution, with cost per gigabyte as low as 2 cents USD. The tradeoff for their larger capacity is their slower access time, which usually involves mechanical manipulation of tapes.  Access to data in a library takes from several seconds to several minutes.

Because of their slow sequential access and huge capacity, tape libraries are primarily used for backups and as the final stage of digital archiving. A typical application of the latter would be an organization's extensive transaction record for legal or auditing purposes. Another example is hierarchical storage management (HSM), in which tape library is used to hold rarely used files from file systems.

Software support 

There are several large-scale library-management packages available commercially. Open-Source support includes AMANDA and the minimal mtx program.

Barcode labels 

Tape libraries commonly have the capability of optically scanning barcode labels which are attached to each tape, allowing them to automatically maintain an inventory of which tapes are where within the library. Preprinted barcode labels are commercially available or custom labels may be generated using commercial or free software. The barcode label is frequently part of the tape label, information recorded at the beginning of the medium to uniquely identify the tape.

Autoloaders 

Smaller tape libraries with only one drive are known as autoloaders. The term autoloader is also sometimes used synonymously with stacker, a device in which the media are loaded necessarily in a sequential manner.

Other types of autoloaders may operate with optical discs (such as compact discs or DVDs) or floppy disks.

See also
Optical jukebox

References 

Library